The International Association of Anti-Corruption Authorities (IAACA) is an independent and non-political anti-corruption organization established at its inaugural Annual Conference and General Meeting held in Beijing, China in October 2006.  The main objective of the organization is to promote the effective implementation of the UN Convention Against Corruption, adopted by the United Nations General Assembly on 31 October 2003, and to assist anti-corruption authorities in the world in preventing and fighting against corruption. Currently, over 140 ACAs from different countries and jurisdictions have joined IAACA as members.

In January 2022, Mr Simon Peh, then-Commissioner of the Independent Commission Against Corruption, Hong Kong, China (Hong Kong ICAC), was elected as the President of IAACA and Hong Kong ICAC took over the office of the IAACA Secretariat at the same time.

Past Leadership

2006-2015
Supreme People's Procuratorate, China

2016-2021
Attorney-General's Office, Qatar

Governance 
The IAACA Executive Committee (ExCo) was elected by the General Meeting held on 5 January 2022. It consists of a President, four Vice-Presidents, 14 Organisational and Honorary Members, two Advisers and an Observer. They are:

President 

Mr Simon Peh, Special Adviser, Hong Kong ICAC

Vice Presidents (in alphabetical order of country)

H.E. Mr Fikrat Mammadov, Minister of Justice, Ministry of Justice, Republic of Azerbaijan

Mr Jorge Bermúdez, Comptroller General, Office of the Comptroller General, Republic of Chile

Mr Charles Duchaine, Director, French Anti-Corruption Agency, France

Adv. JL Andy Mothibi, Head and Chief Executive, Special Investigating Unit, South Africa

Last President (Supernumerary Member)

H.E. Dr Ali Bin Fetais Al-Marri

Honorary Member

Dr Eduardo Vetere, Former Vice-President of IAACA, Former Director of the Division for Treaty Affairs, UNODC

Members (in alphabetical order of country)

Hajah Anifa Rafiza Binti Haji Abd Ghani, Director, Anti-Corruption Bureau, Brunei Darussalam

Ms. Alexandra Rogkakou, Governor, National Transparency Authority, Greece

Dr Giuseppe Busia, President, National Anti-Corruption Authority, Italy

Mr Twalib Mbarak, CBS, Secretary/Chief Executive Officer, Ethics and Anti-Corruption Commission, Kenya

Hon. Tan Sri Dato' Sri Haji Azam bin Baki, Chief Commissioner, Malaysian Anti-Corruption Commission, Malaysia

Dr Navin Beekarry, Director General, Independent Commission Against Corruption, Mauritius

H.E. Mr Mohamed Bachir Rachdi, Chairman, National Authority for Probity, Prevention and Fight Against Corruption, Morocco

Ms Karen Chang, Director and Chief Executive, Serious Fraud Office, New Zealand

Mr Crin-Nicu Bologa, Chief Prosecutor of the Directorate, National Anticorruption Directorate, Romania

Mrs Seynabou Ndiaye Diakhate, Chair, National Office for Combating Fraud and Corruption, Senegal

Mr Denis Tang, Director, Corrupt Practices Investigation Bureau, Singapore

Mr Alejandro Luzón Cánovas, Chief Prosecutor, Special Public Prosecution Office Against Corruption and Organised Crime, Spain

Adviser

Hon. Tan Sri Hj. Abu Kassim bin Mohamed, Former Vice-President of IAACA, Chairman, National Anti-Financial Crime Centre, Malaysia

Mr Giovanni Kessler, Former Executive Member of IAACA, Former Director-General, European Anti-Fraud Office

Observer

Ms Brigitte Strobel-Shaw, Chief of Corruption and Economic Crime Branch, UNODC

Secretary-General

Ms Sally Kwan, Director of International Cooperation & Corporate Services, Hong Kong ICAC

References

External links
IAACA Website

Anti-corruption agencies
International organizations based in China